Humbach is a small river of Thuringia, Germany. It joins the Ilm near Cottendorf.

See also
List of rivers of Thuringia

Rivers of Thuringia
Rivers of Germany